Dr Juma Alifa Ngasongwa (born 13 August 1941 in Ngombo in Ulanga District) is a Tanzanian politician who served as Chama Cha Mapinduzi Member of Parliament for Ulanga Magharibi in the National Assembly of Tanzania.

Ngasongwa grew up in Biro in Malinyi a ward of Ulanga district in Tanzania, and graduated from the University of Suchdol, Prague, Czechoslovakia, in 1967 with a Bachelor of Science degree. He later earned a master's degree from the University of Dar es Salaam in 1980, before completing a PhD at the University of East Anglia, England, in 1988. His PhD was entitled "Evaluation of externally funded regional integrated development programmes (RIDEPs) in Tanzania case studies of Kigoma, Tanga and Iringa regions". He worked as a lecturer at the University of Dar es Salaam (1976–1984) and as a senior lecturer at Sokoine University of Agriculture (1984–1993). He was economic advisor to President Ali Hassan Mwinyi (1993–1995). He served as Minister for Natural Resources and Tourism (1995–1996), Minister for Industry and Trade (2001–2005), and was Minister for Planning, Economy and Empowerment from 2006 to 2008.

References

1941 births
Living people
Tanzanian Muslims
Chama Cha Mapinduzi politicians
Members of the National Assembly (Tanzania)
University of Dar es Salaam alumni
Alumni of the University of East Anglia
Academic staff of the University of Dar es Salaam
Academic staff of Sokoine University of Agriculture